M. Sathyanaryana was an Indian politician belonging to Indian National Congress. He was elected as a member of Karnataka Legislative Assembly from Chamundeshwari in 2008. He died on 6 June 2019 at the age of 74.

References

1940s births
2019 deaths
Indian National Congress politicians
Karnataka MLAs 2008–2013
Indian National Congress politicians from Karnataka